Bauer's leaf-toed gecko (Dixonius aaronbaueri) is a species of lizard in the family Gekkonidae. The species is endemic to Vietnam.

Etymology
The specific name, aaronbaueri, is in honor of American herpetologist .

Geographic range
D. aaronbaueri is found in southern Vietnam, in Binh Thuan Province and Ninh Thuan Province.

Habitat

Description
D. aaronbaueri may attain a snout-to-vent length (SVL) of almost .

Reproduction
The mode of reproduction of D. aaronbaueri has not been ascertained.

References

Further reading
Geissler P, Krohn AR, Rennert D (2011). "Herpetofaunal Records in Coastal Dune Areas, Binh Thuan Province, Southern Vietnam, with the Rediscovery of Oligodon macrurus Angel, 1927". Russian Journal of Herpetology 18 (4): 317–324.
Ngo VT, Ziegler T (2009). "A new species of Dixonius from Nui Chua National Park, Ninh Thuan Province, southern Vietnam (Squamata, Gekkonidae)". Zoosystematics and Evolution 85 (1): 117–125. (Dixonius aaronbaueri, new species).

Dixonius
Reptiles of Vietnam
Endemic fauna of Vietnam
Reptiles described in 2009
Taxa named by Thomas Ziegler (zoologist)